Leucophenga maculata is a European and Asian fruit fly.

References

Drosophilidae
Diptera of Asia
Diptera of Europe
Insects described in 1839
Taxa named by Léon Jean Marie Dufour